Squaxin Island is in the extreme southwestern part of Puget Sound in Mason County, Washington, United States. The island is an Indian reservation of the Native American Squaxin Island Tribe. It once contained a Washington State Park by the same name, which has since been closed, and the land returned to the Squaxin Tribe. There was no resident population as of the 2000 census.

Squaxin Island is separated from Harstine Island, to the east, by Peale Passage.

The island's name comes from the Lushootseed placename sqʷax̌səd.

See also
Squaxin Island Tribe

References

External links
Squaxin Island: Block 1088, Census Tract 9611, Mason County, Washington United States Census Bureau

Landforms of Mason County, Washington
Uninhabited islands of Washington (state)
Islands of Puget Sound
Islands of Washington (state)
Washington placenames of Native American origin